A white wolf or Arctic wolf is a mammal of the Canidae family and a subspecies of the gray wolf.

It may also refer to:

Organizations
 White Wolf (band), a Canadian heavy metal band
 White Wolf (band), white power oi band from the USA
 White Wolf Lodge (Beech Mountain), a ski lodge on Beech Mountain, North Carolina
 White Wolf Publishing, a publisher of role-playing games, notably the World of Darkness
 White Wolves (UK), a British neo-Nazi organization linked to Combat 18
 White Wolves (South Africa), a fictive organization that claimed to be behind the Strijdom Square massacre

People
 Chang An-lo or "White Wolf" (born 1948), Taiwanese fugitive and alleged organised crime boss
 Eduard Mammadov or "White Wolf" (born 1978), Azerbaijani kickboxer

Fictional characters
 Elric of Melniboné or White Wolf, a dark fantasy antihero created by Michael Moorcock 
 Hunter the White Wolf, a Marvel Comics character who is the adopted elder brother of the Black Panther
 The White Wolf, an alias for Bucky Barnes in the Marvel Cinematic Universe
 The White Wolf, an alias for Jon Snow in Game of Thrones
 Geralt of Rivia, a witcher in the books by Andrzej Sapkowski, also known as White Wolf, or Gwynbleidd
 Vaynard, known as the "White Wolf", the king of the fictitious land of Norgard from Brigandine (video game)
 Aniu, or the White Wolf, a character from the 1995 animated film Balto and its 2002 sequel Balto II: Wolf Quest
 Adelina Amouteru, the main protagonist/antagonist from Marie Lu's "The Young Elites" trilogy goes by the aliases of White Wolf

Places
 White Wolf (Yosemite), a location in Yosemite National Park
 White Wolf Mountain, a 460-acre private ski area in the Lake Tahoe area, California
 White Wolf, California, an unincorporated community in Tuolumne County, California
 White Wolf Fault, a geologic fault in southern California

Works
 White Wolf (magazine), a gaming magazine published between 1986 and 1995.
 White Wolf, a book and a television documentary by Jim Brandenburg about the Arctic wolves of Ellesmere Island
 White Wolf (film), a 1990 Japanese anime film directed by Yosei Maeda
 White Wolves: A Cry in the Wild II, a 1993 film directed and written by Catherine Cyran, and a sequel to the 1990 film A Cry in the Wild
 White Fang 2: Myth of the White Wolf, a 1994 film directed by Ken Olin, and a sequel to the 1991 film White Fang
 White Wolves II: Legend of the Wild, a 1995 film and the second sequel to the 1990 film A Cry in the Wild
 Wise Son: The White Wolf, a 1996 comic book series by Ho Che Anderson
 White Wolf, a 1998 novel by Henrietta Branford
 White Wolves III: Cry of the White Wolf, a 2000 film and the third and final sequel to the 1990 film A Cry in the Wild
 White Wolf (novel), a 2003 novel by David Gemmell
 The White Wolf (audiobook), a 2009 novel by Gary Russell, republished in the anthology The Sarah Jane Adventures Collection

See also

 
 
 White (disambiguation)
 Wolf (disambiguation)